Mahendra Manikya (d. 1714) was the Maharaja of Tripura from 1712 to 1714.

Background
Originally named Ghanashyam Thakur, he was born the second son of Maharaja Rama Manikya. His elder brother was Ratna Manikya II who, after having been previously overthrown by a cousin, was restored to the throne by the Mughals in 1695. However, in return Ghanashyam was temporarily sent to the Mughal court as a hostage. At some point, he was awarded the title of Barathakur by his brother.

In 1712, Ghanashyam launched a conspiracy against his brother, having gained the assistance of Murad Beg, an influential member of the royal court. The latter was sent to Dhaka, where he recruited some itinerant forces as well as the assistance of Muhammad Sapi, a local high-ranking officer. Ratna Manikya was forcibly removed from power and Ghanashyam claimed the throne, assuming the regnal name Mahendra Manikya. He had his predecessor first confined to the palace apartments and then killed soon after, with two of the latter's prominent officers also being beheaded.

Reign
Though little is known about his reign, with the Rajmala only describing him as being an "impious ruler", Mahendra appears to have enacted some reforms to the administration. His brothers Durjoy Singh and Chandramani were named Yuvraj and Barathakur respectively. He also attempted to strengthen ties with the neighbouring Ahom kingdom, located in what is present-day Assam. Assamese envoys, already present in Tripura at the time of his ascension, were formerly received at court, with Mahendra sending his own representative, Aribhima Narayana, back with them to Rangpur. Subsequently, a series of warm correspondence, embassies and gifts were dispatched between Mahendra and the Ahom king, Rudra Singha.

However, in August 1714, soon after a third embassy to Tripura was sent, Rudra Singha died, with his successor Siva Singha having little interest in continuing his father's habits. By the time these envoys had arrived in Tripura, in January 1715, Mahendra too had died, having reigned for only 14 months. He was succeeded by his Yuvraj, Durjoy Singh, who took the name Dharma Manikya II.

Notes

References

Kings of Tripura
History of Tripura
1714 deaths